"Nathan Jones" is a song by American girl group the Supremes from their twenty-third studio album, Touch (1971). It was released on April 15, 1971, as the album's lead single. Produced by Frank Wilson and written by Kathy Wakefield and Leonard Caston, "Nathan Jones" was one of eight top-40 entries the Supremes recorded after its original frontwoman, Diana Ross, left the group for a solo career.

Background
The song centers around a woman's longing for her former lover, a man named Nathan Jones, who left her nearly a year ago "to ease [his] mind." Suffering through the long separation ("Winter's past, spring, and fall") without any contact or communication between herself and Jones, the narrator is no longer in love with Jones, remarking that "Nathan Jones/you've been gone too long".

Supremes version
"Nathan Jones" is an unusual entry among the Supremes' singles repertoire for several reasons, not the least of which is the fact that all three members of the group (Jean Terrell, Mary Wilson, and Cindy Birdsong) sing the song's lead vocal in unison. Clydie King was asked to sing along with the group to give the song a fuller vocal sound. While working on the song, producer Frank Wilson had in mind a rock music style of phrasing for the song, resulting in the unison vocals. The unison vocals would repeatedly be dubbed to create a layered harmonic tone. In addition, Wilson had his engineer, Cal Harris, use what can (now) be considered classic studio sensibilities to take The Funk Brothers' backing tracks for "Nathan Jones" and give them a phase shifting sound at various points during the song. This was accomplished by either using a second recorder (as the Beatles would have done) or (less likely) an outboard processor such as the blue faced MXR flanger.

Released as a single on April 15, 1971, with "Happy is a Bumpy Road" as its B-side, "Nathan Jones" peaked at number 16 on the Billboard Pop Singles chart and number eight on the Billboard R&B chart. Overseas, the single reached number five on the UK Singles Chart. "Nathan Jones" was the most successful single released from the Supremes' fourteenth regular studio album, Touch.

Personnel
 Lead and background vocals by Jean Terrell, Mary Wilson, Cindy Birdsong
 Additional vocals by Clydie King
 Instrumentation by The Funk Brothers
 Arranged by Jerry Long and David Van De Pitte
 Engineering by Cal Harris
 Mixed By Russ Terrana

Charts

Weekly charts

Year-end charts

Certifications

Bananarama version

"Nathan Jones" was covered by English girl group Bananarama. There are three distinct versions of Bananarama's rendition of the song.

The first version was released on their 1987 album Wow!, with their original line-up. This version was also featured on the soundtrack to the 1988 film Rain Man. Some of the vocals were sampled on their "I Heard a Rumour" B-side song "Clean Cut Boy".

After Siobhan Fahey was replaced by Jacquie O'Sullivan, Bananarama re-recorded the song (with completely new vocal and instrumental arrangements), dubbed the Psycho Mix. This new version was initially included on vinyl and cassette issues of Greatest Hits Collection. It was then remixed and released as a single, peaking at number 15 on the UK Singles Chart. This version is considered the "official" version of the song, and is the version used for the accompanying music video.

A third version of the single, the Dave Ford Mix, while similar to the Psycho Mix, opens with a staccato synthesiser instead of the single-note of the Psycho Mix, and includes more prominent synthesiser throughout. It uses the vocals from the Psycho Mix, although brought more to the front of the instrumentation. This mix appears on the Canadian version of Greatest Hits Collection, and is the version which most closely resembles how it is heard when Bananarama plays live. (This mix is alternatively known as the "Analogue" mix, as it was never issued on CD until the "Megarama" compilation in 2015).

All three versions have 12″ remixes available.

Music video
The music video, directed by Andy Morahan, featured the girls performing the song with vogue-style choreography with four male dancers dressed in British-style suits, hats, and umbrellas. Their performance is interspersed with shots of them strutting down a fashion catwalk in three different outfits, reflecting the three different seasons mentioned in the song (winter, spring, fall/autumn), and performing the main choreography in yet a fourth change of wardrobe. Sara and Keren are seen sharing the same black-with-copper-coloured-leaves jacket throughout.

Individual shots of the girls are accompanied by floating images of fruits and art objects, such as vases and statues.

The video was nominated for British Video of the Year at the 1989 Brit Awards, but lost to Michael Jackson's "Smooth Criminal".

Performances
The group performed the song on several popular shows of the day, including Top of the Pops, The Great Big British Pop Machine, at the 1988 Royal Variety Performance in the presence of the Queen Mother and, famously, on the Terry Wogan show, in which Keren is seen doing the first verse choreography during the second verse. None of these appearances feature live vocals.

Track listings
7-inch single / Japanese 3-inch CD single
"Nathan Jones" – 3:18
"Once in a Lifetime" – 4:05

12-inch single
"Nathan Jones" (Extended Version) – 5:12
"Nathan Jones" (Instrumental Dub Mix) – 3:18
"Once in a Lifetime" – 4:05

US 12-inch single
"Nathan Jones" (Psycho Mix) – 6:27
"Nathan Jones" (Instrumental Dub Mix) – 3:18
"Nathan Jones" (Bass Tone Mix) – 5:07
"Once in a Lifetime" – 4:05

UK CD single / Japanese CD mini-album
"Nathan Jones" (Extended Version) – 5:11
"Venus" (Extended Version) – 7:25
"Once in a Lifetime" – 4:04

Japanese CD mini-album (remix)
"Nathan Jones" (Psycho Mix) – 6:24
"I Want You Back" (Extended European Version) – 7:55
"Once in a Lifetime" – 4:05

Personnel
 Sara Dallin – vocals
 Jacquie O'Sullivan – vocals
 Siobhan Fahey – vocals
 Keren Woodward – vocals, bass guitar

Charts

Other versions
"Nathan Jones" has also been remade by: 
Paul Davis (album Cool Night, 1981) 
Nicolette Larson (album All Dressed Up and No Place to Go, 1982).

References

1971 singles
1971 songs
1988 singles
Bananarama songs
London Records singles
Motown singles
Nicolette Larson songs
Paul Davis (singer) songs
Song recordings produced by Frank Wilson (musician)
Song recordings produced by Stock Aitken Waterman
Songs about fictional male characters
Songs written by Kathy Wakefield
Songs written by Leonard Caston Jr.
The Supremes songs